Mariano López (born 29 March 1973) is an Argentine snowboarder. He competed in the men's giant slalom event at the 1998 Winter Olympics.

References

1973 births
Living people
Argentine male snowboarders
Olympic snowboarders of Argentina
Snowboarders at the 1998 Winter Olympics
Place of birth missing (living people)